Navdeep Pallapolu (born 26 January 1986) is an Indian actor and television personality who appears in Telugu films along with Tamil films. He made his film debut in 2004 with the patriotic sports drama Jai. He starred in films such as Arinthum Ariyamalum (2005), Gowtam SSC (2005), Chandamama (2007), Arya 2 (2009), Baadshah (2013), Ice Cream (2014), Dhruva (2016), Nene Raju Nene Mantri (2017), Ala Vaikunthapurramloo (2020), and Run (2020).

Navdeep is also prominent in the television industry, as he finished in 4th place in the first season of the reality TV show Bigg Boss Telugu. In 2018, he hosted the game show for film and serial celebrities on Star Maa, Tollywood Squares. In 2020, he was a judge on the comedy TV show Adhirindi. Navdeep further starred in web series such as Mana Mugguri Love Story (2017), Gangstars (2018), and Masti's (2020).

Film career

Navdeep has appeared in both Telugu and Tamil films, portraying diverse characters. Navdeep's first film appearance was in the 2004 Telugu romantic film, Jai, in which he played an Indian boxer fighting Laskar-E-Taiba terrorists. The movie was a hit. In the 2005 Tamil blockbuster Arinthum Ariyamalum, he portrayed a hero who is the son of the don, Prakash Raj, who was estranged from his father. His following films were primarily forgettable and failed at the box office, despite him gaining a reputation as a talented actor.

His biggest break was the 2007 film Chandamama, where he starred along with Kajal Aggarwal, in which his performance as a flirty and naughty youth won high praise. The film was one of the biggest blockbusters of 2007, and Navdeep and Kajal won high accolades. He later essayed a lead role in Arya 2 opposite Kajal once again and Allu Arjun, and he received praise for his character with grey shades. Despite it being a multi starrer with Allu Arjun, Navdeep made his presence felt in this box office hit.

From 2010 till 2013, he continued to star in diverse films, which include Om Shanti opposite Aditi Sharma, Kajal Aggarwal, and Nikhil Siddharth, the mystery thriller Yagam, slapstick comedy Mugguru, romantic drama Aakasame Haddu, a cameo in Oh My Friend, and the thriller Mythri, none of which made a mark at the box office.

In 2013, Navdeep played the powerful main antagonist opposite Jr. NTR in Baadshah, and the film was a blockbuster. Later that year, he starred in masala flick Vasool Raja, in which Srihari played an important role. That movie failed at the box office. In 2014, his crime comedy Bangaru Kodipetta was an average venture, in which he starred opposite Swathi Reddy, and then he played the male lead in the supernatural horror flick Ice Cream, which was a hit at the box office. He also hosted the "3rd South Indian International Movie Awards" that year. He played a cameo role in Anukshanam and his next film Poga flopped. In 2015 he starred in another crime drama Bham Bolenath, which flopped miserably, and played a cameo in Tamil movie Idhu Enna Maayam.

In 2016, Navdeep hosted the 1st IIFA Utsavam Awards with Allu Sirish and Regina Cassandra. He also made a cameo appearance in the Hindi flick Azhar and played an important supporting character in Ram Charan's blockbuster movie  Dhruva. He later played a crucial role in Nene Raju Nene Mantri in 2017, which also starred Rana Daggubati.  He finished as in 4th place on the reality TV show Bigg Boss Telugu in 2017. In 2018 he starred in Gangstars, a crime drama web series alongside Jagapati Babu and Swetha Basu Prasad. The series was promoted heavily like a film and got a positive reception. After nearly 3 years in 2018, following the new success of Gangstars, he starred as a hero once again in romantic comedy Next Enti, opposite Tamannaah and Sundeep Kishan. This film unfortunately failed at the box office. In 2020, he played a supporting role in blockbuster action comedy Ala Vaikunthapurramloo, which stars Allu Arjun and Pooja Hegde. In the same year, Navdeep starred as the main lead in psychological thriller Run, which was panned by critics.

He has given his voice to an HIV/AIDS education animated software tutorial created by the nonprofit organization TeachAids, and he is an avid humanitarian supporting various other causes and charities.

Television career
Navdeep has hosted the Fear Factor adaption in Telugu, Super, along with a few film festivals. His most notable appearance in Television was when he appeared as a wildcard contestant in popular reality TV show Bigg Boss Telugu, in which he gained large praise and exposure due to his charm and wit. He finished in 4th place. He then appeared in Yupp TV's rom com Mana Mugguri Love Story, in which he played a cool, successful, and young businessman. The show also starred Tejaswi Madivada and Adith Arun in other lead roles, and was received well. In 2018, he started hosting his own game show Tollywood Squares on Star Maa, and many celebrities came to participate. The show had 26 episodes in the first season.

Filmography

Film

As dubbing artiste
Keka (2008) for Raja

Television

References

External links

 

Living people
Telugu male actors
Indian male film actors
Male actors in Telugu cinema
21st-century Indian male actors
Bigg Boss (Telugu TV series) contestants
Male actors in Tamil cinema
Male actors from Andhra Pradesh
1986 births